Szczepkowo may refer to the following places:
Szczepkowo, Masovian Voivodeship (east-central Poland)
Szczepkowo, Pomeranian Voivodeship (north Poland)
Szczepkowo, Warmian-Masurian Voivodeship (north Poland)